Asim Gope is a Bangladeshi professional field hockey player who plays as a goalkeeper and is an international player in Bangladesh. He is a player of Bangladesh national field hockey team.

Asim

Asim Gope 

Competitions as an Athlete

Competition

2012 World League R1 Men-Singapore Senior Mens Outdoor

Hero Hockey World League Round 2-IND (Men) Senior Mens Outdoor

2013 Asia Cup-Men Senior Mens Outdoor

Asian Games Qualifying Tournament (M)

Senior Mens Outdoor

World League R1 2014/2015-BANGLADESH (M)

Senior Mens Outdoor

17th Asian Games 2014 - KOREA (M)

Senior Mens Outdoor

Junior AHF Cup 2014 (M) Under 21 Mens Outdoor

World League R2 2014/2015 (M): Singapore

Senior Mens Outdoor

2015 Junior Asia Cup: Men Under 21 Mens Outdoor

2016 South Asia Games (M) Senior Mens Outdoor

2016 Test Matches: AUT v BAN (Men)

Senior Mens Outdoor

2016 5th Men's AHF Cup Senior Mens Outdoor

2017 Men Hockey World League Round 2-Dhaka (BAN) Senior Mens Outdoor

Hero Men's Asia Cup 2017 Senior Mens Outdoor

Men's Asian Games Qualifier 2018 Senior Mens Outdoor

2018 Asian Games (M) Senior Mens Outdoor

Men's Indoor Asia Cup Chonburi 2019

Senior Mens Indoor

Caps as an Athlet

References 

People from Sylhet
Bangladeshi male field hockey players
Field hockey players at the 2014 Asian Games
Field hockey players at the 2018 Asian Games
Asian Games competitors for Bangladesh
Year of birth missing (living people)
South Asian Games bronze medalists for Bangladesh
South Asian Games medalists in field hockey
Living people